Andrey Olegovich Karginov (born 23 February 1976) is a Russian rally raid driver, best known for winning the 2014 and the 2020 Dakar Rally in the truck category for Kamaz.

The team of Karginov, Mokeev and Leonov was one of the forerunners at the 2019 Dakar Rally, giving the way only to the team of Eduard Nikolaev, but they were disqualified for not "stopping to attend the injured spectator" after a collision in the 5th stage.

Dakar Rally results

* 2010: Mechanic of Ilgizar Mardeev

Winner
Dakar Rally: 2014, 2020
Silk Way Rally: 2018
Africa Eco Race: 2017
Khazar Steppes: 2006 (as mechanic of Chagin)
Russian Championship: 2011
Kagan's Gold: 2011, 2013
Great Kalmykiya: 2006 (as mechanic of Mardeev)
Grand Steppe: 2015

Awards
2008: Honorary diploma of Kamaz OAO
2010: Medal of the "Order of Merit for the Motherland" II Degree
2010: Merit badge "For the Service to the Town of Naberezhnye Chelny"
2013: Medal "For Valorous Labour"
2014: Gratitude by President of Tatarstan
2014: Honorary diploma of Kamaz OAO
2014: Medal "To the Glory of Ossetia"
2015: Title "Merited Machinist of Tatarstan"
2015: "Order of Friendship"
2017: Medal of the "Order of Merit of Tatarstan"

References

External links
Profile on Dakar Rally
Profile on Team Kamaz Master

Dakar Rally drivers
Dakar Rally winning drivers
1976 births
Living people
Russian rally drivers
Off-road racing drivers
Rally raid truck drivers